Latvian Republic may refer to:

Republic of Latvia, a Baltic state
Latvian Socialist Soviet Republic (1918-1920), an independent Soviet Latvian state
Latvian Soviet Socialist Republic (1940-1991), a constituent republic of the Soviet Union